Simon Scott may refer to:

 Simon Scott (actor) (1920–1991), American character actor
 Simon Scott (drummer) (born 1971), English drummer, formerly of Slowdive and Lowgold
 Simon Scott (painter) (1966–2014), British artist and musician

See also

Scott (name)